Alan Henry Garner (2 February 1951 – 23 July 2020) was an English professional footballer best known as a player for Watford.

Career

Starting out with his local team Millwall, Garner only made two league appearances before moving on to Luton Town in 1971. His time at Luton proved to be more productive, as Garner played 88 times in the league and helped Luton to promotion in 1973–74. After relegation in 1975, he was controversially sold to rivals Watford.

At Watford, Garner became a key player, appearing 200 times in the league during his five years at Vicarage Road, as well as being voted player of the season in 1977–78. Sold in 1980 to Portsmouth, he spent two years on the south coast before moving into non-League football with Barnet.

References

1951 births
2020 deaths
English footballers
English Football League players
Millwall F.C. players
Luton Town F.C. players
Watford F.C. players
Portsmouth F.C. players
Barnet F.C. players
Association football defenders
Footballers from Lambeth